Sento Sé is a municipality in the state of Bahia in the North-East region of Brazil.

Sento Sé has a peculiar history. It is among the five cities that had to be flooded because of construction of the Sobradinho Dam. The new Sento Sé erected in 1974, was being gradually populated by residents of the former headquarters, which plunged into the waters.

History 
The name Sento Sé comes from an ancestral indigenous tribe called Centoce. The first foreign settlers were Portuguese sugar cane producers that built mills in that area. The foundation of the municipality was in 1832 by a provincial decree.

In the 1970s the city passed for one of the most complicated moments. The construction of Sobradinho Dam obligated the moving of the city and another little communities close to the river to another place 62 kilometers away, in 1974.

See also
List of municipalities in Bahia
Loja Maçônica Deus Harmonia e Amor nº 149
Urucé

References

Municipalities in Bahia